Sheikh Hamdan Bin Zayed Stadium is a multi-use stadium in Madinat Zayed, United Arab Emirates.  It is currently used mostly for football matches and is the home ground of Dhafra. It holds 5,020 people.

References

Football venues in the United Arab Emirates
Sports venues in the Emirate of Abu Dhabi